Video games in Turkey is a massive industry with many branches of it and also covers pastime in Turkey that includes the production, sale, import/export, and playing of video games.

Market statistics
In 2021, the market statistics in total reached 1.2B$, around 600M$ coming from mobile games. Turkey’s market statistics were $464 million in 2015, while in 2016 it was $755 million and most of the revenue in 2016 was $332.5 million in mobile games, the rest was obtained from the computer and console genre. Turkey grew 7.2% compared with the previous year, in online game revenue during 2016, Turkey ranked 16th in the world in both the mobile PC and console area. Today in general & with all genres, Turkey stands at 18th globally. The global rank within all genres has not seen a change.

Many big Turkish developer companies exist, such as Peak in the mobile games genre, Tale Worlds in the PC genre for many years. (e.g Mount & Blade.)

Professional gaming
Turkey has a presence in the professional e-sports market, especially in League of Legends and other games created by Riot Games. 

E-Sport team found that the market for more than ten professionals from more than four thousand in Turkey are also licensed e-athletes. Beşiktaş and traditional sports clubs also stepped in, and other sports clubs, especially Galatasaray and Fenerbahçe, joined the e-Sports market.

The Türkiye Digital Games Federation was established in 2011 and later superseded by the e-Sports Federation of Turkey  on April 24, 2018.

Rating System 
In Turkey, the most widely used video game content rating system PEGI (Pan European Gaming Information), does not have a legal basis that supports it officially but it was semi-officially introduced to the country in 2014-2015 and is used in both foreign and Turkish published video games all around the country, and in almost all cases, though Turkey is not officially represented in the PEGI council. Other labels can be seen as well such as the German USK specially on second-hand items. 

In 2006, the Intellectual Property Registration and Registration Department made arrangements about a regulation "Computer Games", a new regulation for using & regarding marking content ratings system that was and has been implemented for film, television and video games in the Turkish market that are sold. -Although the criteria used for marking are still officially and legally some-what uncertain, but for video games is dominated by PEGI, this method is mostly applied to products  sold physically, there is no control mechanism for video games acquired through digital distribution etc.

With the Regulation on Internet Bulk Use Providers, which came into force in 2009, made the play of video games (or the screening of films) that include drug or stimulant habit, suicidal orientation, sexual abuse, obscenity, prostitution, violence, gambling etc. like-elements  prohibited at public workplaces, though not applying to certain private workplaces. 

Although the PEGI rating system is still not official and not legally supported, based on the government regulations and laws, games can be banned by the Ministry of the Interior. So far no games have been banned, even if banned, did not have an affect at all and their bans were either forgotten, or lifted (unbanned). Though certain games were investigated as to whether they should be banned, or reported,  there were no outcomes in those cases and the games were left untouched and playable. 

Games that  cause adverse effects can be banned entirely if reported and investigated, but again none have been banned so far either. Games can still be unavailable to be played due to the choice of the publishers specifically not making them available or playable in the Turkey region, but they are all still available physically and still playable if accessed physically. (Except online web-based game sites) 
See video-game bans (Turkey) for more information.

Video Game Development

Game developers from Turkey

 Berzah Games (Also co-devs)
 Bluespy Studio
 Gorilla Softworks
 Hyperlab
 Lamagama Entertainment
 Laps Games
 Motion Blur
 Nowhere Studios
 Pinq Games
 Redivided Studios
 Sobee Studios (Additional page)
 TaleWorlds Entertainment
 Team Machiavelli
 Team Untested
 The Pack Studios
 Turquoise Revival Games
 Wendigo Games
 Zoetrope Interactive

Misc Games

 AEON Game Studio (Unknown portfolio)
 Dirty LEDS (Unknown portfolio)
 Flamingo Game Studio (Mobile, AR/VR games)
 Funverse Games (Online games)
 gamegine (Unknown portfolio)
 Gyroscoping Games (Serious games)
 Hypernova Technology & Gaming (Unknown portfolio)
 Inventuna Games (Blockchain)
 Kumkat Games (Online games)
 Makemake Studio (Mobile, blockchain games)
 OTTO Games (Mobile, serious, AR/VR games)
 Rokogame Studios (Blockchain services)
 Semruk Games (Edutainment, serious games)
 Simurgify TECH (Games, websites, mobile apps)

Mobile games

Co-Development Services

 ForceNCode (Games, apps, websites)
 Kyoso Interactive (Online games)
 Oyun Teknolojileri ve Yazılım (Games, interactive apps, apps, websites)

Defunct video game developers

 Dark Zone Game Studio (Founded 2016. Defunct 2022.)
 Future Dreams (Est. 1990?)
 Locus Design (Est. 1990-1993)
 Ollric Games (Inactive 2021-2022. Mobile games.)

Video game publishers of Turkey

 Digi Game Startup Studio (Support startups)
 Game Factory (Support startups)
 Pera Games (Support startups & teams)
 Youcan Games (Support startups & teams)

Publisher & developer firms 

 Alictus (Mobile games)
 AIx2 Games
 Apphic Games (Primarily mobile games)
 Babil Studios (Mobile games. Not the same as the Jordan company 'Babil Games'.)
 Backpack Games (Mobile games)
 Blackburne Games
 Core Engage Yazılım A.Ş.
 Cultic Games
 Cyperk Software
 DBK Games (aka. 'Burak Dabak')
 GameDeus
 Happy Game Company (Mobile games)
 Inspector Studios (Primarily mobile games)
 LIGHTWORKER GAMES
 LootCopter Game Studio (Mobile games)
 MildMania (Mobile/online games)
 Ruby Game Studio (Mobile games)
 Udo Games (Mobile games)

Online games portal/distribution

 EPIN Ödeme ve İletişim Teknolojileri A.Ş. (Distribution)
 Kabasakal Online
 Klasgame.Com
 MGM Bilgi Teknolojileri A.Ş
 Oyunfor
 Vatangame.com (Distribution)
 YeşilyurtGame (Distribution)

References

Video gaming in Turkey
Science and technology in Turkey
Turkish culture

Sources

https://en.wikipedia.org/w/index.php?title=Category:Video_game_companies_of_Turkey&oldid=1004294974